Ligota Tworkowska  (German Ellguth Tworkau) is a village in the administrative district of Gmina Lubomia, within Wodzisław County, Silesian Voivodeship, in southern Poland.

The village has a population of 145.

References

Ligota Tworkowska